

Theodred was a medieval Bishop of Elmham.

Theodred was consecrated before 974, however, his death or end of episcopate is not known.

References

External links
 —conflated with Theodred (bishop of London)

Bishops of Elmham